A game jam is an event where participants try to make a video game from scratch. Depending on the format, participants might work independently, or in teams. The event duration usually ranges from 24 to 72 hours. Participants are generally programmers, game designers, artists, writers, and others in game development-related fields. While many game jams are run purely as a game-making exercise, some game jams are contests that offer prizes.

Traditionally, game jams focus on video games; however, board games have also been the subject of game jams.

History
The term game jam is a composition of the words game and jam session. A jam session describes the musical act of producing music with little to no prior preparation in an effort to develop new material or simply to practice. In the same way, game jams are events in which game developers prototype experimental ideas into playable games.

In March 2002, video game developers Chris Hecker and Sean Barrett, interested in the capability of modern hardware in rendering a large number of sprites, worked with Doug Church, Jonathan Blow, and Casey Muratori in developing a specialized game engine capable of rendering a massive number of sprites. Hecker and Barrett invited a small group of video game developers to meet in Hecker's office in Oakland, California for the purpose of creating innovative video games using this newly built engine. Hecker and Barrett named this gathering the 0th Indie Game Jam, a game design and programming event "designed to encourage experimentation and innovation in the game industry".

Format

Location

Some game jams are local events, taking place in universities, conference halls, or other private spaces. The Global Game Jam takes place at the end of January of every year, with over 800 locations in 100+ countries around the world. The Ludum Dare is an example of a virtual game jam, an event where participants largely remain at home, but present their efforts at the conclusion of the jam.

Time constraint
Game jams typically have restrictive time limits, ranging from a few hours to several days. This time constraint is meant to simulate the pressure of a deadline and to encourage creativity among ideas produced by game jam teams.

Theme
A game jam may be centered on a theme, which all games developed within the jam must adhere to. The theme is usually announced shortly before the event begins, in order to discourage participants from planning for the event beforehand and from using previously-developed material. In addition, themes are meant to place restrictions on developers, which encourages creativity.

Ludum Dare 24, a competitive game jam event, featured the theme of "Evolution". As stated by the Ludum Dare rules, all participants in the competition were recommended to create a game based on this theme. However, the rules also stated that participants were not required to use the theme, which allowed for games to be made outside of the theme.

Technology
The type of technology can vary depending on the type of game being developed, and among the different disciplines involved.

In a video game jam, teams are generally made up of at least a programmer and an artist. A programmer would work in a development environment such as Microsoft Visual Studio for development in a .NET Framework application or Eclipse for a Java-based application. An artist may use tools such as Adobe Photoshop, Blender 3D or Autodesk Maya. Other tools used by developers include videogame frameworks such as the Unreal Engine, CryEngine, Unity, Godot, and Microsoft XNA Framework. If in a team, developers might use communication services such as Discord, and source control services such as GitHub.

See also
 Demoparty
 Hackathon
 BarCamp
 Amnesia Fortnight
 Global Game Jam
 Indie Game Jam
 Ludum Dare
 Nordic Game Jam
 TOJam
 Game Off
 Js13kGames
 Train Jam

References
 

Video game culture
 
Video game development competitions